Timonium Business Park station (formerly Timonium station) is a Baltimore Light Rail station in Timonium, Maryland. It opened as part of the system's initial operating segment in 1992. The station originally had a parking lot which was later removed. It has two side platforms serving two tracks.

References

External links

MTA Maryland - Light Rail stations

Baltimore Light Rail stations
Railway stations in the United States opened in 1992
Railway stations in Baltimore County, Maryland
1992 establishments in Maryland
Timonium, Maryland